The Rocky Mountain Rage were a professional ice hockey team that played in the Central Hockey League between the 2006–07 and 2008-09 seasons.  They played their home games at the Broomfield Event Center in Broomfield, Colorado.

On June 18, 2009, the team announced it was suspending operations for the 2009–10 CHL season with hopes of returning in 2010–11, but went defunct.

Year-by-year record

Regular season

Playoffs

All-Stars

Players
 2007 David Noah, Goalie
 2007 Mark Wires, Left Wing
 2008 Tyler Butler, Defenseman
 2008 Brent Cullaton, Right Wing, Starter, North Captain, North MVP
 2008 Scott Reid, Goalie
 2008 Scott Wray, Left Wing, Starter
 2009 Daymen Rycroft, Center

References

External links 
Rocky Mountain Rage - broken link
"All The Rage" - Rocky Mountain Rage Booster Club - broken link

Ice hockey teams in Colorado
Broomfield, Colorado